This is a list of notable people of Sri Lankan descent living in the United Kingdom. "Sri Lankan Britons" refers to all Sri Lankan ethnic groups.

Business and Industry 
Most of the Srilankan Britons are doing businesses such as cornershops , petrol stationss , restaurants, jewellery stores, textiles, etc.
 Subaskaran Allirajah, businessman and entrepreneur, founder of the Lycamobile, world's largest MVNO based in UK.
 Karunamoorthy, film producer and founder of Ayngaran International.
 Arjuna Sittampalam, financier.
 Ratheesan Yoganathan, British entrepreneur, and founder of the Lebara.

Academic
 Nishan Canagarajah
 Abhaya Induruwa
 Sunitha Wickramasinghe

Actors
 Jai Akash
 Tony Jayawardena
 Amara Karan
 Albert Moses
 Romesh Ranganathan, British stand-up comedian, actor and presenter.
 Kim Vithana

Engineers
 Cecil Balmond
 Shini Somara
 Kanagaratnam Sriskandan

Lawyers
 Desmond Lorenz de Silva

Media
Tamil media like IBC Tamil, Deepam TV are headquartered in UK.
 George Alagiah
 Nigel Barker
 Suranga Chandratillake
 James Coomarasamy
 Rasantha Cooray
 Vernon Corea
 Darshini David
 Elmo Fernando
 Christopher Greet
 Rohan Jayasekera
 Neville Jayaweera
 Tim Kash

Military
 Jack Churchill
 Cyril Nicholas

Musicians
 Arjun Coomaraswamy
 Beverley Craven
 Rohan de Saram
 Desmond de Silva
 Tanya Ekanayaka (composer-pianist)
 Siva Kaneswaran
 Lay Low
 M.I.A.
 Nimal Mendis
 Andrew Nethsingha (born 1968), choral conductor and organist
 DJ Nihal
 Ashan Pillai

Physicians
 Sir Sabaratnam Arulkumaran
 Henry Speldewinde de Boer
 Ajith Kumar Siriwardena
 Richard Lionel Spittel

Politicians
 Desmond Lorenz de Silva
 Nirj Deva
 Jan Jananayagam
 Ranil Jayawardena
 Alexander Robert Johnston

Religion

 Kamal Chunchie
 Bogoda Seelawimala Nayaka Thera
 Lakshman Wickremasinghe

Scientists
 Suran Goonatilake
 Cyril Ponnamperuma
 Chandra Wickramasinghe

Sports
 Francis Bacon
 Alistair Blair
 Jude Chaminda
 Dimitri Mascarenhas
 Gehan Mendis
 Walter Philps
 Murugan Thiruchelvam
 Duncan White
 Glucka Wijesuriya

Writers
 Mahinda Deegalle
 Rohan Jayasekera
 Michael Ondaatje
 Nadarajah Selvarajah
 Ambalavaner Sivanandan

Others
 Kali Arulpragasam
 Peter Kuruvita
 Sir Christopher Ondaatje
 Ganesh Sittampalam

See also
 List of Sri Lankans

References

b
Sri Lanka
Sri Lankan